Harvestehude (Hamburgisch: Harvstehuud) is a quarter of Hamburg, Germany, in the borough of Eimsbüttel. It is located on the eastern boundaries of the borough near lake Außenalster.

Geography
Harvestehude borders the quarters of Rotherbaum, Eimsbüttel, and Hoheluft-West, all within the Eimsbüttel borough, as well as Hoheluft-Ost, Eppendorf, and Winterhude in the neighbouring Hamburg-Nord borough. Harvestehude is located on a Geest ridge west of the Außenalster. To the north the canal of Isebekkanal separates Harvestehude of Hoheluft-Ost and Eppendorf.

History
The name is derived from the former name of the local St. John's Monastery, Herwardeshude, which had been located in Altona near today's street and small stream of Pepermölenbek at least since 1246. Herward was a common name in the 12th and 13th century, so it is assumed that the name means a stockyard near a ferry dock (Hude), which was founded by a man called Herward. Later, in 1295, the monastery moved to today's Harvestehude area, transferring the monastery's name to the new area. Hamburg history writer Otto Beneke noticed that the place was also called Herbstehude by some, which was according to him indeed correct, because Herbst (autumn) translates to Harvest in Low German. In 1530, the monastery was demolished, and the area came under municipal administration.

Other than the name suggests, the church of St. John's Harvestehude, which was built 1880-82, is today located in the neighbouring Rotherbaum quarter. Vice versa, the Tennis court Am Rothenbaum and the NDR broadcasting center ("Funkhaus am Rothenbaum") are located in the quarter of Harvestehude.

Politics
These are the results of Harvestehude in the Hamburg state election:

References

External links

 Harvestehude, Hamburg.de

Quarters of Hamburg
Eimsbüttel